Lois Bromfield is a Canadian-American comedic actor, writer, and television producer originally from Toronto, Ontario. Her credits include Roseanne, Grace Under Fire, The Jackie Thomas Show and The New Hollywood Squares. In 1990, Bromfield appeared with Chris Aable in her first television interview, along with her HBO comedy video on Aable's show, Hollywood Today where she was interviewed along with her then-husband Steve Moore .

She was in a lavender marriage to comedian Steve Moore from 1980 to 1995, which ended after they both decided to publicly come out as gay. Bromfield officially came out as lesbian in 1994 on The Arsenio Hall Show.

She gained American citizenship in the 1990s, and has been living with her partner near Nürnberg, Germany, since 2009. She is the sister of Valri Bromfield and film director Rex Bromfield.

Filmography
 1985: actor, "Sorority Girls from Hell" segment, Television Parts (NBC)
 1990: celebrity guest, Hollywood Today
 1991–1995: co-producer, writer, Roseanne (ABC)
 1996: consulting producer, The Drew Carey Show (ABC)
 1997: producer, writing supervisor, Grace Under Fire (ABC)
 1998: consulting producer, Brother's Keeper (ABC)
 2001–2002 – talk show executive co-producer (Citytv)
 2006: producing promotional shorts for At the Cineplex (HBO)

References

External links
 

American television actresses
American stand-up comedians
American women comedians
American television producers
American women television producers
American television writers
Canadian television actresses
Canadian stand-up comedians
Canadian women comedians
Canadian emigrants to the United States
Canadian television producers
Canadian television writers
Living people
Actresses from Toronto
Comedians from Toronto
Writers from Toronto
American women television writers
Year of birth missing (living people)
Canadian lesbian actresses
American lesbian writers
American lesbian actresses
Lesbian comedians
Canadian women screenwriters
20th-century Canadian comedians
21st-century Canadian comedians
20th-century Canadian actresses
Canadian lesbian writers
Canadian LGBT screenwriters
21st-century American women writers
Canadian women television writers
Canadian women television producers
Canadian LGBT comedians
American LGBT comedians
Lesbian screenwriters
21st-century Canadian LGBT people
20th-century Canadian LGBT people